L'horizon chimérique, Op. 118, is a song cycle by Gabriel Fauré, of four mélodies for voice and piano. Composed in 1921, the cycle is based on four of the poems from the collection of the same name by Jean de La Ville de Mirmont.

Composition
This was Fauré's last song cycle, composed in the autumn of 1921. Other late works he completed towards the end of 1921 were Cello Sonata No. 2, Op. 117, in November, and Nocturne No. 13, Op. 119, in December.

The song cycle was published by Durand in April 1922.

Settings
Fauré's settings are as follows:

"La mer est infinie"
"Je me suis embarqué"
"Diane, Séléné"
"Vaisseaux, nous vous aurons aimés"

Premiere
L'horizon chimérique had its premiere at the Société Nationale de Musique on 13 May 1922, sung by baritone Charles Panzéra, to whom the cycle was dedicated. He was accompanied on the piano by his wife, Magdeleine Panzéra-Baillot. This concert also premiered Fauré's Cello Sonata No. 2. Shortly afterwards, on 20 June the Panzéras contributed a performance of L'horizon chimérique to a celebration of Fauré's works held in the Sorbonne's Grand Amphitheatre, attended by President of France Alexandre Millerand.

Charles Panzéra recorded "Je me suis embarqué" and "Diane, Séléné" in 1925, and in 1936 recorded the complete song cycle. He described his performance technique for L'horizon chimérique in his 1964 instructional work, 50 mélodies françaises.

References

Sources

External links

French texts and English translations, at The LiederNet Archive
Complete text of the original poems on French Wikisource

Song cycles by Gabriel Fauré
1921 compositions
Mélodies
Classical song cycles in French